Christopher John McCabe (born 20 October 1967) is a British scientist and novelist. He is Professor of Molecular Endocrinology at the University of Birmingham.and writes novels under the pseudonyms John McCabe and John Macken.

He was born in Vancouver to English parents who were originally from Yorkshire. The family later returned to England and settled in Somerset.

Publications

Novels as "John McCabe"
 Stickleback
 Paper
 Snakeskin
 Big Spender
 Herding Cats

Novels as "John Macken"
Dirty Little Lies
Trial by Blood
Breaking Point
Control

References

External links
McCabe, Chris (5 February 2004). "A mission to sex up scientese". The Guardian

British writers
1967 births
Living people